Barabus (rendering of Tatar barabız “we are going”  + English bus) was a winter public transport in 19th – early 20th centuries, probably the first public transport in Kazan after cabs. They were operated by private carriers who were poor Tatar commoners from surrounding villages. A typical barabus was a sledge sheeted with sacking. Barabus was a transport of paupers competing with cabs, horse railways and later tramway. Until the 1930s, when trams were installed in the suburbs and any private enterprise was prohibited, barabuses were the only transport to connect quarters of poor mill-hands with other parts of the city.

References

History of Kazan
History of Tatarstan
History of transport in Russia
Transport in Kazan
Animal-powered vehicles